Shubek Gill (born 16 December 1991) is an Indian cricketer. He made his first-class debut for Punjab in the 2016–17 Ranji Trophy on 13 October 2016. In January 2018, his name was included in the 578 players for the 2018 IPL auction, due to be held in Bengaluru on 27 January 2018.

References

External links
 

1991 births
Living people
Indian cricketers
Punjab, India cricketers
Sportspeople from Dehradun
Cricketers from Uttarakhand